Oh, Yeah! (also written as Oh, Yeah?) is a 1929 American pre-Code action film directed by Tay Garnett and starring Robert Armstrong, James Gleason and Zasu Pitts. The film's sets were designed by the art director Edward C. Jewell. An early sound film, it was made during the transition from the silent era. It is also known by the alternative title No Brakes after the original story it is based on that appeared in The Saturday Evening Post.

Cast
 Robert Armstrong as Dude Cowan
 James Gleason as Dusty Reilly
 Patricia Caron as Pinkie
 Zasu Pitts as The Elk
 Budd Fine as Pop Eye
 Frank Hagney as Hot Foot
 Harry Tyler as Splinters
 Paul Hurst as Railroad-Yard Superintendent
 Bobby Dunn as Railroad Man at Bonfire

References

Bibliography
 Munden, Kenneth White. The American Film Institute Catalog of Motion Pictures Produced in the United States, Part 1. University of California Press, 1997.

External links
 

1929 films
1920s action films
1920s English-language films
American action films
Films directed by Tay Garnett
American black-and-white films
Pathé Exchange films
1920s American films